Libercourt is a commune in the Pas-de-Calais department in the Hauts-de-France region of France.

Geography

History
Libercourt was once an integral part of the neighbouring town of Carvin. It became an independent commune in 1947. The discovery of coal led to the creation of large towns in the region. The tiny hamlet of Libercourt became a mining town forming part of the conurbation on the territory centred on Lens. Libercourt became home to many Polish immigrants looking for and finding work in the mining industry during the early part of the 20th century.
During two world wars, Libercourt and its people suffered severely at the hands of the invading Germans who knew all too well the importance to the regional economy of this mining and railway centre.

Population

Places of interest
 The church of Notre-Dame, dating from the nineteenth century.
 The modern church of St. Henri.
 A war memorial.

Notable people
 Léon Glovacki, footballer was born here.
 Guillaume Bieganski, footballer was born here.

Twin towns
  Jarocin, Poland, since 1977

See also
Communes of the Pas-de-Calais department

References

External links

 Commune website 
 The war memorial at Libercourt 

Communes of Pas-de-Calais
Artois